Catherine Bellis was the defending champion but withdrew before the competition began.

Zhang Shuai won the title, defeating Jang Su-jeong in the final, 0–6, 6–2, 6–3.

Seeds

Draw

Finals

Top half

Bottom half

Qualifying

Seeds

Qualifiers

Qualifying draw

First qualifier

Second qualifier

Third qualifier

Fourth qualifier

References
Main Draw
Qualifying Draw

Hawaii Tennis Open
Hawaii Tennis Open
2017 in sports in Hawaii